Maurice Slater is a former Irish association football player who played as a defender.

Slater was part of the roster of the North American Soccer League (NASL) team Washington Diplomats, usually wearing the number three shirt. He played one season with the Dips in the 1974 NASL season, making five appearances and registering one assist. The Diplomats would finish last in the Eastern Division.

References

Republic of Ireland association footballers
Republic of Ireland expatriate association footballers
North American Soccer League (1968–1984) players
Washington Diplomats (NASL) players
Expatriate soccer players in the United States
Irish expatriate sportspeople in the United States
Association football defenders